The 1981 Dora Mavor Moore Awards celebrated excellence in theatre from the Toronto Alliance for the Performing Arts.

Winners and nominees

General Theatre Division

Musical Theatre or Revue Division

See also
35th Tony Awards
1981 Laurence Olivier Awards

References

1981 in Toronto
Dora Awards, 1981
Dora Mavor Moore Awards ceremonies